Pyatnitsky (masculine) or Pyatnitskaya (feminine) is a Russian surname. It is shared by the following people:
Andrey Pyatnitsky (b. 1967), Russian association football player
Konstantin Pyatnitsky (1864–1938), Russian journalist, publisher, and memoirist
Mitrofan Pyatnitsky (1864–1927), Russian musician, founder of the Pyatnitsky Choir
Osip Piatnitsky (Pyatnitsky) (1882–1938), Soviet politician
Valery Pyatnitsky (b. 1962), Ukrainian politician

Fictional characters
Maxim Arturovitch Pyatnitski, the protagonist of the Pyat Quartet tetralogy  by Michael Moorcock

See also
Pyatnytsky, Ukrainian form of the last name